Treble may refer to:

In music:
Treble (sound), tones of high frequency or range, the counterpart of bass
Treble voice, a choirboy or choirgirl singing in the soprano range
Treble clef, a symbol used to indicate the pitch of written notes
Treble (musical group), a three-piece girl group from the Netherlands
Treble, in change ringing, the bell with the highest pitch
Treble, another name for the alto recorder musical instrument

Other uses:
Treble (association football), the achievement of winning three top tier trophies in one season
The Treble (rugby league), in British competition, winning all three available domestic titles in one season
Treble (Mega Man), a character in the Mega Man video game series
Treble, a crochet stitch
Treble, a type of bet covering three selections
Project Treble, an Android feature to separate system and vendor for faster system update roll-up

See also
Triple (disambiguation)